Thunderhoof is a 1948 American Western film directed by Phil Karlson and starring Preston Foster, Mary Stuart and William Bishop. The film's sets were designed by the art director Walter Holscher.

Plot
Texas rancher Scotty Mason goes into the Mexican desert-country in search of a wild horse, and takes his young wife, Margarita and his hired-hand, The Kid, whose life Scotty had saved a few years earlier. The Kid falls in love with Magarita before they have crossed the Texas border, and spends more time plotting to get rid of Scotty than he does horse-hunting. Before long the two are engaged in fisticuffs in a mountain pass, but Scotty spots the horse he is hunting (Thunderhoof) and the chase is on. Scotty breaks his leg in the capture and, with a make-shift splint, Scotty, the Kid, Margarita and the horse start the return trek to Texas. Scotty and the Kid get into another fight, in a blinding sand-storm, and the Kid tosses Scott in a ravine, and tells Margarita that Scotty has deserted them. She joins the Kid, and learns the truth about Scotty after the delirious Kid drinks from a poisoned-water hole.

Cast
 Preston Foster as Scotty Mason 
 Mary Stuart as Margarita 
 William Bishop as The Kid 
 Dice as Thunderhoof

References

Bibliography
 Gene Freese. Jock Mahoney: The Life and Films of a Hollywood Stuntman. McFarland, 2013.

External links

1948 films
1948 Western (genre) films
American Western (genre) films
Columbia Pictures films
Films directed by Phil Karlson
1940s English-language films
1940s American films